New Miserable Experience is the second studio album by alternative rock band Gin Blossoms, released on August 4, 1992. The album was released to little fanfare and relatively lackluster reviews. However, nearly a year after its release the lead single "Hey Jealousy" entered the top 40. With "Found Out About You" following a few months later, the album eventually reached multi-platinum status.

Background
The band's original lead guitarist, Doug Hopkins, was fired near the conclusion of the recording sessions for the album, ostensibly for his persistent alcohol problems. His replacement, Scott Johnson, is listed as a member of the band in the liner notes, but did not play on the album. Just as the album was becoming a success at the end of 1993, Hopkins died by suicide.

New Miserable Experiences initial release had completely different packaging. The album's original cover artwork depicted the Arizona desert. Several songs on the album were written with references to the area, people, and events surrounding the band at the time, such as "Mrs. Rita", which is a song about a local psychic from the Gin Blossoms' hometown of Tempe, Arizona. The majority of the songs rely on a melody-driven pop style, while the final track, "Cheatin'", leans into country.

The album was re-released with a new cover without the original Arizona desert photo, in late summer 1993, in conjunction with A&M's newfound support of the album. Lead singer Robin Wilson specifically requested artistic control over the new release, recalling, "I did insist that I have total control over the new cover. So what you see on New Miserable Experience, those are all my photographs. I did the layout, I handwrote all the lyrics and I made sure that I had control over that."

Musical style
The album's music has been described as alternative rock, and jangle pop.

Critical reception

Rolling Stone praised the album, saying it "sounds both fresh and highly personal."  AllMusic called the album "a tight and lean collection of brilliant, edgy pop music."

Track listing 
"Lost Horizons" (Doug Hopkins) – 3:20
"Hey Jealousy" (Hopkins) – 3:56
"Mrs. Rita" (Jesse Valenzuela, Jim Swafford) – 4:25
"Until I Fall Away" (Robin Wilson, Valenzuela) – 3:51
"Hold Me Down" (Hopkins, Wilson) – 4:50
"Cajun Song" (Valenzuela) – 2:56
"Hands Are Tied" (Valenzuela) – 3:17
"Found Out About You" (Hopkins) – 3:53
"Allison Road" (Wilson) – 3:18
"29" (Valenzuela) – 4:18
"Pieces of the Night" (Hopkins) – 4:33
"Cheatin'" (Valenzuela, Hopkins) – 3:25

Reissue
To celebrate the album's tenth anniversary in 2002, a deluxe edition containing an extra disc of demos, outtakes and live performances was released by the label. The Rarities Album was released separately in Abbreviated form in 2010 as Rarities, missing the three cuts from Dusted.

Reissue track listing
"Something Wrong" (Valenzuela) - 2:40
"Slave Dealer's Daughter" (Hopkins, Bill Leen) - 2:32
"Fireworks" (Hopkins) - 3:05
"Keli Richards" (Hopkins, Leen) - 3:04
"Just South of Nowhere" (Valenzuela) - 3:26
"Angels Tonight" (Hopkins) - 3:33
"Blue Eyes Bleeding" (Hopkins) - 2:30
"Soul Deep" (Wayne Carson Thompson) - 3:05
"Heart Away" (Wilson) - 2:21
"Cold River Dick" (Wilson, Valenzuela, Leen, Phillip Rhodes, Scott Johnson) - 1:16
"Christine Irene" (Wilson, Valenzuela) - 2:42
"Number One" (John Lennon, Paul McCartney, Neil Innes) - 2:35
"Idiot Summer" (Wilson) - 4:13
"Back of a Car" (Alex Chilton, Andy Hummel) - 2:43
"Allison Road '94 (remix)" (Wilson) - 3:22
"Hold Me Down (live)" (Hopkins, Wilson) - 4:55
"Hey Jealousy (live)" (Hopkins) - 3:57
"Mrs. Rita (live)" (Swafford, Valenzuela) - 4:20
"29 (live)" (Valenzuela) - 4:07
"Movin' On Up (live)" (Jeff Barry, Ja'net Dubois) - 2:57
"Folsom Prison Blues (live)" (Johnny Cash) - 3:08
"Pieces of the Night (with piano ending)" (Hopkins) - 4:20
 Tracks 1-3: from Dusted (1989)
 Tracks 4-6: from Up and Crumbling (1991)
 Track 7: outtake from New Miserable Experience
 Tracks 8-11: from Shut Up and Smoke (1994); "Soul Deep" also appears on the soundtrack album from the movie Speed
 Track 12: outtake from Shut Up and Smoke
 Track 13: from Music from the Motion Picture Wayne's World 2 (1993)
 Track 14: previously unreleased; intended for a Big Star tribute album
 Tracks 15, 22: alternate versions of songs from New Miserable Experience
 Tracks 16-21: recorded live on May 13, 1993 at Solana Beach, CA

Personnel

Gin Blossoms
Robin Wilson - lead vocals, acoustic guitar
Doug Hopkins - guitars (Credited for performance and writing, uncredited as an active bandmember)
Jesse Valenzuela - guitars, mandolin, background vocals, lead vocals on "Cheatin'"
Bill Leen - bass
Phillip Rhodes - percussion, drums

Additional Personnel
Robert Becker - piano on "Until I Fall Away" and "Pieces of the Night"
C. J. Chenier - accordion on "Cajun Song"
Robby Turner - pedal steel guitar on "Cheatin'" and "Cajun Song"

Production
Producers: Gin Blossoms, John Hampton
Engineer: John Hampton
Assistant Engineer: James "Left Of" Senter
Mixing: John Hampton
Mastering: George Marino
Art direction: Barrie Goshko
Design: Barrie Goshko
Photography: Jay Blakesberg, Robin Wilson
Crew: Jim Coleman, Scott Guess, Mike Chappell
Recorded at: Ardent Studios (Memphis, TN), except: "Allison Road" and "Mrs. Rita", recorded at: AB Recorders (Phoenix, AZ) By: Andy Barret

Original 1992 release:
Art direction and design: Rowan Moore
Photography: Dennis Keeley
Radiator: Kelly Ray

Chart performance

Weekly charts

Year-end charts

Certifications

References

Gin Blossoms albums
1992 albums
A&M Records albums
Albums produced by John Hampton (music producer)